Coenyra is a butterfly genus from the subfamily Satyrinae in the family Nymphalidae.

Species
Coenyra aurantiaca Riley, 1938
Coenyra hebe (Trimen, 1862)
Coenyra rufiplaga Trimen, 1906

References

Satyrini
Butterfly genera
Taxa named by William Chapman Hewitson